The qualification for football tournament at the 1964 Summer Olympics.

Qualifications 
The final tournament had 16 spots.

The others were allocated as follows:

 Europe: 5 places, contested by 21 teams.
 South America: 2 places, contested by 7 teams.
 North and Central America: 1 places, contested by 5 teams.
 Africa: 3 places, contested by 11 teams. 
 Asia: 3 places, contested by 13 teams.

Europe

Group 1

Preliminary round 

|}

First round 

|}

First round play-off 
in Turin, Italy

|}

Second round 

|}
Romania qualified for the 1964 Summer Olympics.

Group 2

First round 

|}

Second round 

|}
Hungary qualified for the 1964 Summer Olympics.

Group 3

Preliminary round 

|}

First round 

|}

Second round 

|}

Second round play-off 
in Warsaw, Poland

|}

United Team of Germany qualified for the 1964 Summer Olympics.

Group 4

First round 

|}

Second round 

|}
Italy originally qualified for the 1964 Summer Olympics, but were later disqualified for using professional players. 

Poland were offered Italy's place, but declined due to a lack of preparation time.

Group 5

Preliminary round 

|}

First round 

|}

Second round 

|}
Czechoslovakia qualified for the 1964 Summer Olympics: Greece were  disqualified by their own federation on the morning of the first leg after it was discovered they had professional players.

South America

North and Central America

Preliminary round 

|}

Final round

Africa

Group 1

First round 

|}

Second round 

|}
United Arab Republic qualified for the 1964 Summer Olympics.

Group 2

First round 

|}

Second round 

|}
Ghana qualified for the 1964 Summer Olympics.

Group 3

First round 

|}

Second round 

|}
Morocco qualified for the 1964 Summer Olympics.

Asia

Preliminary Round 

|}
|}
|}
|}
|}
1Republic of China were disqualified after they objected to playing at a neutral venue for the play-off and refused to travel.
 

2–2 on aggregate.
 
As  objected to playing at a neutral venue for the play-off and refused to travel, they were disqualified; therefore,  advanced to Round One.
 

Thailand won 4–3 on aggregate.
 

Iran won 4–2 on aggregate.
 

India won 12–3 on aggregate.

Round One 

|}
|}
|}
|}
|}
|}
|}
1Philippines, Indonesia and Lebanon withdrew.
 

South Vietnam won 2–1 on aggregate
 

North Korea won 1–0 on aggregate
 

Iran won 4–0 on aggregate

Round Two 

|}
|}
|}
|}
 

South Korea won 5–2 on aggregate, so South Korea qualified.
 

All games played in Burma, North Korea won 7–0 on aggregate, so North Korea qualified.
 

Iran won 6–1 on aggregate, so Iran qualified.

References

External links 
 RSSSF

Olympics qualificaition
Olympics qualificaition